William Frels co-founded the town of Frelsburg, Texas around 1837 with his brother John Frels. He immigrated to Texas from Germany in 1834. He spoke German and additional languages Spanish and English when Texas came under Mexican and U.S. rule.

References

German emigrants to the Republic of Texas
Year of death missing
Year of birth missing